Michael Byron may refer to:

 Michael Byron (footballer) (born 1987), English footballer
 Michael J. Byron (artist) (born 1954), visual artist
 Michael J. Byron (general) (born 1941), United States Marine Corps general